"The Parallel" is episode 113 of the American television anthology series The Twilight Zone. In this episode an astronaut returns from a voyage to find the world not quite the same as he remembers it. It was an early example of the concept of mirror or alternate universes. The Star Trek: The Original Series episode "Mirror, Mirror" was another example, although the differences between the characters in the two Star Trek alternate universes were quite noticeable. The concept has also been used by both DC Comics and Marvel Comics in their comic books and cinematic universes.

Opening narration

Plot
An astronaut, Major Robert Gaines, is orbiting Earth in his space capsule. Suddenly, his communication systems stop functioning and he blacks out, waking up on Earth with no memory of his return. He appears to be none the worse for his experiences and is released to the custody of his family.

However, inconsistencies quickly pop up. His daughter senses that he is not the same person. His house has a white picket fence that he's never seen, though his wife insists that it was there when they bought the house. Everyone calls him Colonel (confirmed by the rank insignia on his uniform) when he knows he's a Major, and he insists that the President of the United States is John F. Kennedy, a man whom no one else has ever heard of. Gaines concludes that he has slipped into a parallel universe. His acquaintances see this as nonsense until a mechanic reports his space capsule is not completely identical to the one he was sent out in. Gaines is summoned to examine the capsule, but when he approaches it he is gradually returned to the point at which he left his own universe.

He lands his craft safely and reports what happened to his superiors. They are prepared to write it off as a nightmare, but controllers on the ground subsequently receive another transmission—from Colonel Robert Gaines. The transmission cuts out a few seconds later, and the Colonel disappears from radar. The Major returns home and happily confirms that his daughter now recognizes him and the white picket fence is absent.

Closing narration

Cast
Steve Forrest as Robert Gaines
Jacqueline Scott as Helen Gaines
Shari Lee Bernath as Maggie Gaines
Frank Aletter as Colonel Bill Connacher
Philip Abbott as Gen. Eaton
Morgan Jones as Captain
William Sargent as Project Manager
Paul Comi as Psychiatrist

Legacy
"Parallels", an episode of Star Trek: The Next Generation, has plot elements similar to this story

References

External links 
 

1963 American television episodes
The Twilight Zone (1959 TV series season 4) episodes
Television episodes about parallel universes
Television episodes written by Rod Serling
Works about astronauts